Agkud is a traditional Filipino fermented rice paste or rice wine of the Manobo people from Bukidnon. The rice wine pangasi  is made from agkud except fermented longer for at least one month. Modern versions of the agkud can use other sources of starch like cassava, sorghum, or corn. Hot peppers may also be used instead of ginger. Agkud is drunk during celebrations, rituals, and various social events.

See also
 Bahalina
 Basi
 Kaong palm vinegar
 Nipa palm vinegar
 Pangasi
 Tapuy

References

Fermented drinks
Philippine alcoholic drinks
Philippine cuisine